Sida is a genus of ctenopods in the  family Sididae. There are about five described species in Sida.

Species
These five species belong to the genus Sida:
 Sida americana Korovchinsky 1979
 Sida angusta Dana 1852
 Sida aurita (Fischer, 1849)
 Sida crystallina (O. F. Müller, 1776)
 Sida ortiva Korovchinsky 1979

References

Further reading

 
 
 

Cladocera
Branchiopoda genera